The Fiagril Participações S.A., or Fiagril is a large Brazilian company involved in the soybean industry localized in Cuiabá, the capital of Mato Grosso state.

References

Mato Grosso
Lucas do Rio Verde
Agriculture companies of Brazil
Trading companies of Brazil
Trading companies established in the 20th century